A skeleton is a type of physically manifested undead often found in fantasy, gothic and horror fiction, and mythical art. Most are human skeletons, but they can also be from any creature or race found on Earth or in the fantasy world.

Myth and folklore
Animated human skeletons have been used as a personification of death in Western culture since the Middle Ages, a personification perhaps influenced by the valley of the dry bones in the Book of Ezekiel. The Grim Reaper is often depicted as a hooded skeleton holding a scythe (and occasionally an hourglass), which has been attributed to Hans Holbein the Younger (1538). Death as one of the biblical horsemen of the Apocalypse has been depicted as a skeleton riding a horse. The Triumph of Death is a 1562 painting by Pieter Bruegel the Elder depicting an army of skeletons raiding a town and slaughtering its occupants.

"The Boy Who Wanted the Willies" is a Brothers Grimm fairy tale in which a boy named Hans joins a circle of dancing skeletons.

In Japanese folklore, Mekurabe are rolling skulls with eyeballs who menace Taira no Kiyomori.

Mexico 
Figurines and images of skeletons doing routine things are common in Mexico's Day of the Dead celebration, where skulls symbolize life and their familiar circumstances invite levity. Highly-decorated sugar-skull candy has become one of the most recognizable elements of the celebrations. They are known in Mexico as calacas, a Mexican Spanish term simply meaning "skeleton".
The modern association between skeleton iconography and the Day of the Dead was inspired by La Calavera Catrina, a zinc etching created by Mexican cartoonist José Guadalupe Posada in the 1910s and published posthumously in 1930. Initially a satire of Mexican women who were ashamed of their indigenous origins and dressed imitating the French style, wearing heavy makeup to make their skin look whiter, it later became a more general symbol of vanity. During the 20th Century, the Catrina entrenched itself in the Mexican consciousness and became a national icon, often depicted in folk art.

Modern fiction

Literature 

 The animated skeleton features in some Gothic fiction. One early example is in the short story "Thurnley Abbey" (1908) by Perceval Landon, originally published in his collection Raw Edges. It is reprinted in many modern anthologies, such as The 2nd Fontana Book of Great Ghost Stories and The Penguin Book of Horror Stories.
An anthropomorphic depiction of Death which looks like a skeleton in a black robe appears in almost all volumes of Terry Pratchett's fantasy series Discworld, including five novels where he is the lead character.
 In the manga/anime One Piece, Brook, who is one of the main characters, is an animated skeleton after consuming the Revive-Revive Fruit.

Film and TV 

 Undead skeletons have been portrayed in fantasy films such as The 7th Voyage of Sinbad (1958), The Black Cauldron (1985), Army of Darkness (1992), The Nightmare Before Christmas (1993), and Corpse Bride (2005).
 An extended battle scene against an army of skeletal warriors was produced by animator Ray Harryhausen for Jason and the Argonauts (1963) and is remembered as one of the most  sophisticated and influential visual effects sequences of its day.

Games 

 Animated skeletons have been used and portrayed extensively in fantasy role-playing games. In a tradition that goes back to the pen-and-paper game Dungeons & Dragons, the basic animated skeleton is commonly employed as a low-level undead enemy, typically easy for a player to defeat in combat. Thus, in games which make use of them, such enemies often appear relatively early in the gameplay and are considered a suitable opponent for novice players. In these contexts, they are commonly armed with medieval weapons and sometimes wear armor. Scott Baird from Screen Rant called skeletons stereotypical as a combat encounter for beginning characters, and believes that has "bled over to most video game RPGs". Some games also introduce higher-level variants with heightened resilience or combat skills as well as the ability to cast spells or communicate, as well as even less powerful versions, like tiny skeletons, which Baird ranked among the weakest monsters in D&D. He found those disappointing as "there is no fun in a combat encounter that ends with stomping on some little skeletons".
 In the PlayStation action-adventure series MediEvil, the protagonist is an animated skeleton knight named Sir Daniel Fortesque.
 In the 1999 cult classic Planescape: Torment, Morte is a character who joins the protagonist on his quest and is essentially a sentient, levitating human skull with intact eyeballs who cracks wise and fights by biting.
 In the 2009 Minecraft video game, skeletons appear as bow-wielding monsters that shoot players with their bows and burn under the sunlight unless they wear helmets. Sometimes the skeletons spawn with enchanted bows or a random piece of armor, or random full armor, or without bow, and they can pick melee weapons. On Halloween, they can spawn wearing carved pumpkins or Jack O' Lanterns on their heads. Variants include the wither skeleton, which causes the player to wither away, and the stray, which is a frozen variant.
 In the video game Fable III, there exist a race of antagonal characters called "hollow men" which are featured throughout the game.
 A duo of animated skeleton brothers plays an important role in the role-playing game Undertale. Named Sans and Papyrus, the brothers' dialogue text is printed in Comic Sans and Papyrus fonts, respectively.
 Following a poll taken during their Kickstarter campaign, Larian Studios added a playable skeleton race in their 2017 RPG Divinity: Original Sin II, as well as an ancient skeletal character named Fane.
 Following the first game, the skeletons were re-added in Minecraft Dungeons, a 2020 dungeon crawler game released by Mojang Studios as the guards of The Nameless One, the king of the undead. In this form, they are equipped with glaives, shields, and iron helmets and chestplates, and are referred to as Skeleton Vanguards. They also spawn as their original bow-wielding form, sometimes wearing iron helmet. Other DLCs include exclusive variants of skeletons.
 The Legend of Zelda series features an enemy called Stalfos, armed skeletons who serve as regular enemies and occasionally as minibosses. Variations such as Stalkids and Stalblins also appear in various games in the series.
 In the Elder Scrolls series, skeletons are featured as one of the undead creatures and they are armed.
 In Heroes of Might and Magic 3, skeletons are recruitable troops from the Town, Necropolis.

See also
 La Calavera Catrina
 Death (personification)
 Gashadokuro
 Hone-onna
 Mummy (undead)
 Revenant
 Santa Muerte
 The Skeleton Dance
 Skull art
 Zombie

References 

Corporeal undead
Personifications of death
Skeletons
Undead
Supernatural legends